Osmoy-Saint-Valery is a commune in the Seine-Maritime department in the Normandy region in north-western France.

Geography

History
Commune created in 1823 by the fusion of the three communes of Maintru, Osmoy and Saint-Valery-sous-Bures.

Population

Places of interest
 The church of Notre-Dame, dating from the twelfth century.
 The chapel at Maintru.
 A sixteenth-century stone cross.
 The manorhouse de La Valouine, built in 1602 by the seigneurs de Ricarville.

See also
Communes of the Seine-Maritime department

References

Communes of Seine-Maritime